The Sweet River is a river of Jamaica.

The source of Sweet River is Sweet River Cave, Cairn Curran.

See also
List of rivers of Jamaica

References

 GEOnet Names Server
OMC Map
CIA Map
Ford, Jos C. and Finlay, A.A.C. (1908).The Handbook of Jamaica. Jamaica Government Printing Office

Rivers of Jamaica